Fulvia (c. 83 BC – 40 BC) was an aristocratic Roman woman who lived during the Late Roman Republic. Fulvia's birth into an important political dynasty facilitated her relationships and, later on, marriages to Publius Clodius Pulcher, Gaius Scribonius Curio, and Mark Antony. All of these men would go on to lead increasingly promising political careers as populares, tribunes, and supporters of Julius Caesar.

Fulvia remains an important figure in ancient Roman history due to her perseverance as a woman heavily involved in politics, as well as her role in the Perusine War against Octavian (future emperor Augustus). She played an important political role behind the scenes of her three marriages. Though she is most famous for her involvement in Antony's career, there are many scholarly debates taking place over whether or not Fulvia was already involved in politics before her husbands or as a result of marrying them. However, one thing is for sure: she was highly interested in politics and developed an increasingly strong public voice over time. She is most famous for her activities during her third marriage and her involvement in the Perusine War of 41–40 BC. She was the first Roman non-mythological woman to appear on Roman coins.

Birth and early life
Fulvia was born and raised either in Rome or Tusculum. Her date of birth is not known. Fulvia was a member of the Fulvia gens, which hailed from Tusculum. The Fulvii were one of the most distinguished Republican plebeian wealthy families in Rome; various members of the family achieved consulship and became senators, though no member of the Fulvii is on record as a consul after 125 BC. Fulvia was the only child of Marcus Fulvius Bambalio and Sempronia. As a result, Fulvia may have also represented the last of both the Fulvii and the Sempronii families, which meant she was likely an heiress of extreme worth and value. Her father Marcus received the nickname "Bambalio", from the Latin "to stutter", because of his hesitancy in speech. Her maternal grandfather was Sempronius Tuditanus, who was described by Cicero as a madman, who liked to throw his money to the people from the Rostra.

Marriage to Clodius Pulcher

Her first marriage was to Publius Clodius Pulcher, circa 62 BC. Fulvia and Clodius had two children together, a son also named Publius Clodius Pulcher and a daughter, Claudia. As a couple they went everywhere together. Claudia later married the future Emperor Augustus.

In 52 BC, Clodius ran for praetor and political competition with a consular candidate and rival, Titus Annius Milo, escalated to violence. Milo and his gang killed Clodius on January 18 on the Appian Way, the road built by Clodius's ancestors. Fulvia first appears in the record after his death. Fulvia and her mother Sempronia were present at the trial of Milo, and Fulvia's was the last testimony given by the prosecution. Milo was exiled for his crime.

While alive, Clodius had control of many gangs, and Fulvia retained the power and status that came with their loyalty. There is some evidence that she may have been involved in organizing the collegia. Even after Clodius' death however, the Clodian following remained strong because of Fulvia's understanding of her political potential. After the death of her husband, Fulvia used her strong political following to avenge his death: she and her mother brought his body to the streets of Rome so the Roman citizens would see his wounds, and grow angry towards Milo.   as a sign that she was to be his avenger. Fulvia would therefore actively invest herself into the political atmosphere that followed the death of her first husband, as a "visible symbol and reminder of his presence."

Marriage to Scribonius Curio
With Pompey's seizure of power in Rome, he militarily forced out any remaining supporters of the late Clodius (including captains and tribunes), which prompted Fulvia to continue on her late husband's legacy alone within the city, taking advantage of every opportunity that allowed her to extend her influence and political prestige.

Her widowhood did not last long, as the customary period of mourning for Romans was ten months. Fulvia most likely married her second husband, Gaius Scribonius Curio, soon after his return from Asia and her mourning period had passed. They were married in 52-51 BC, ultimately solidifying him as the legitimate "continuator and heir of Clodius' popularis policies," though initially an optimate. Like Clodius, Curio was very popular with the plebeians. He was from a less distinguished family than Clodius, being from a new consular family, but he may have had more wealth. He soon became important to Gaius Julius Caesar and Clodian supporters, becoming a trusted and valued political ally to these vitally important individuals because of his marriage to Fulvia and her emphasis on promoting the Clodian legacy. In 50 BC, the year after he married Fulvia, Curio won election as a tribune.

Curio died in 49 BC. He was killed during the Battle of the Bagradas in North Africa, fighting for Julius Caesar against King Juba I of Numidia. During the civil war, Fulvia was most likely in Rome or nearby, due to Caesar's troops taking over Italy. At the time, she would have had her two children by Clodius and was either pregnant with Curio's son or had delivered him.

Marriage to Mark Antony

After Curio's death in Africa, Fulvia was still an important widow in elite circles and her political interests were well known. She provided an important tie to Clodius and his clientela, and could offer a husband money and political organization. Also, her husband would become the stepfather of Clodius' children, further linking him to Clodian politics.

Fulvia's third and final marriage was to Mark Antony in 47 or 46 BC, a few years after Curio's death, although Cicero suggested that Fulvia and Antony had had a relationship since 58 BC. Cicero wrote about their relationship in his Philippicae as a way of attacking Antony. According to him, while Fulvia and Clodius were married, Antony once left a military post to sneak back into Rome during the night and personally deliver a love letter to Fulvia describing his love for her and how he had stopped seeing the famous actress Cytheris. Cicero also suggested that Antony married Fulvia for her money. At the time of their marriage, Antony was an established politician. He had already been tribune in 49 BC, commanded armies under Caesar and was the Master of the Horse in 47 BC. Fulvia's marriage to Antony was not one of subordination, rather, they had become a "formidable political force" within the crucial city of Rome. They had two sons together, Marcus Antonius Antyllus and Iullus Antonius.

Fulvia played a very influential role in Mark Antony's political career. She was the brains behind many of his policies (such as the decision to give Sicilians Roman citizenship, as well as to confirm Deiotarus in his kingdom), as well as a very persuasive campaigner for her husband. It is also possible that former Clodian policies were continued through him. Throughout their marriage, Fulvia defended Antony from Cicero's attacks, sustained his popularity with his soldiers and hindered Octavian's ascension to power. In fact, Fulvia still retained the support of gangs formerly ruled by her first husband, Clodius. Antony was able to gather that support by publicly associating himself with Clodius' children. Antony was able to use what was left of Clodius' gangs through Fulvia's influence in his own gang wars against Dolabella and his supporters.

Through the political connections of his wife and his close friendship with Caesar, Antony was found to be the most powerful man in Rome after Caesar's assassination.  Therefore, it was only fitting that Fulvia was to be heavily involved in the political aftermath. After Caesar's death, the senate realized his popularity and declared that it would pass all of Caesar's planned laws. Antony had attained possession of Caesar's papers, and with the ability to produce papers in support of any law, Fulvia and Antony made a fortune and gained immense power. She allegedly accompanied Antony to his military camp at Brundisium in 44 BC. Appian wrote that in December 44 and again in 43 BC, while Antony was abroad and Cicero campaigned for Antony to be declared an enemy of the state, Fulvia tried to block such declarations by soliciting support for Antony.

Antony formed the Second Triumvirate with Octavian (the future emperor Augustus) and Marcus Aemilius Lepidus in 43 BC and began to conduct proscriptions. To solidify the political alliance (and the advancing of Clodian interests), Fulvia's daughter Claudia was married to the young Octavian. Appian and Cassius Dio describe Fulvia as being involved in the violent proscriptions, which were used to destroy enemies and gain badly needed funds to secure control of Rome. Antony pursued his political enemies, especially Cicero, who had openly criticized him for abusing his powers as consul after Caesar's assassination. Although many ancient sources wrote that Fulvia was happy to take revenge against Cicero for Antony's and Clodius' sake, Cassius Dio is the only one who describes the joy with which she pierced the tongue of the dead Cicero with her golden hairpins, as a final revenge against Cicero's power of speech.

Perusine War (41 BC to 40 BC) and Fulvia's death
In 42 BC, Antony and Octavian left Rome to pursue Julius Caesar's assassins, Marcus Junius Brutus and Gaius Cassius Longinus. Fulvia was left behind as the most powerful woman in Rome, seeing as though she had already manifested her political aptitudes throughout the decades. According to Cassius Dio, Fulvia controlled the politics of Rome. Dio wrote that "the following year Publius Servilius and Lucius Antonius nominally became consuls, but in reality it was Antonius and Fulvia. She, the mother-in‑law of Octavian and wife of Antony, had no respect for Lepidus because of his slothfulness, and managed affairs herself, so that neither the senate nor the people transacted any business contrary to her pleasure."

Shortly afterwards, the triumvirs distributed the provinces among them. Lepidus took the west and Antony went to Egypt, where he met Cleopatra VII. Octavian returned to Rome in 41 BC to dispense land to Caesar's veterans, divorced Fulvia's daughter and accused Fulvia of aiming at supreme power. Fearing that Octavian was gaining the veterans' loyalty at the expense of Antony, Fulvia traveled constantly with her children to the new settlements in order to remind the veterans of their debt to Antony. Fulvia also tried to delay the land settlements until Antony returned to Rome, so that the two triumvirs could share the credit. With Octavian in Italy and Antony abroad, Fulvia allied with her brother-in-law Lucius Antonius and publicly endorsed Mark Antony in opposition to Octavian.

These actions caused political and social unrest. In 41 BC, tensions between Octavian and Fulvia escalated to war in Italy. According to Appian, Fulvia was a central cause of the war, due to her jealousy of Antony and Cleopatra's affair in Egypt; she may have escalated the tensions between Octavian and Lucius in order to draw back Antony's attention to Italy. However, Appian also wrote that the other main causes were the selfish ambitions of the commanders and their inability to control their own soldiers.

Together with Lucius Antonius, Fulvia raised eight legions in Italy to fight for Antony's rights against Octavian, an event known as the Perusine War. The army occupied Rome for a short time, and Lucius organized his troops at Praeneste, but eventually retreated to Perusia (modern Perugia), where Octavian besieged him. Lucius waited for Antony's legions in Gaul to come to his aid. However, unaware of the war, Antony was still in the eastern provinces, and his legions were unsure of his commands and did not assist Lucius. Although during this conflict, Fulvia was at Praeneste, there is evidence she helped Lucius. According to Appian, she "urged Ventidius, Asinius, and Calenus from Gaul to help Lucius, and having gathered another army, she sent it to Lucius under the command of Plancus." During the war, Octavian's soldiers at Perusia used sling bullets inscribed with insults directed at Fulvia personally and Octavian wrote a vulgar epigram directed at her in 40 BC, referring to Antony's affair with the ex-courtesan queen of Cappadocia Glaphyra. It is recorded by Martial within one of his own poems:
Spiteful censor of the Latin Language, read
six insolent verses of Caesar Augustus:
"Because Antony fucks Glaphyra, Fulvia has arranged
this punishment for me: that I fuck her too.
That I fuck Fulvia? What if Manius begged me
to bugger him? Would I? I don't think so, if I were sane
"Either fuck or fight", she says. Doesn't she know
my prick is dearer to me than life itself? Let the trumpets blare!"
Augustus, you certainly grant my clever little books pardon,
since you are the expert at speaking with Roman frankness

The siege at Perusia lasted two months before Octavian starved Lucius into surrender in February 40 BC. After Lucius' surrender, Fulvia fled to Greece with her children. Appian writes that she met Antony in Athens, and he was upset with her involvement in the war. Antony then sailed back to Rome to deal with Octavian, and Fulvia died of an unknown illness in exile in Sicyon, near Corinth, Achaea. After her death, Antony and Octavian used it as an opportunity to blame their quarrelling on her. According to Plutarch, "there was even more opportunity for a reconciliation with Caesar. For when Antony reached Italy, and Caesar manifestly intended to make no charges against him, and Antony himself was ready to put upon Fulvia the blame for whatever was charged against himself."
After Fulvia's death, Antony married Octavian's sister, Octavia Minor, to publicly demonstrate his reconciliation with Octavian. Antony never regained his position and influence in Italy.

Once Antony and Octavia were married, she took in and reared all of Fulvia's children.  The fate of Fulvia's daughter, Clodia Pulchra, after her divorce from Octavian is unknown. Her son Marcus Antonius Antyllus was executed by Octavian in Alexandria, Egypt in 30 BC. Her youngest child, Iullus Antonius, was spared by Octavian and raised from 40 BC by Octavia Minor. Iullus married Octavia's daughter and Octavian's niece Claudia Marcella Major and they had a son Lucius Antonius and possibly a daughter Iulla Antonia.

See also
Women in Rome
List of Roman women

References

Citations

Bibliography

 
 L. Fezzi, Il tribuno Clodio, Roma-Bari 2008.
 Eleanor G. Huzar, Mark Antony: Marriages vs. Careers, The  Classical Journal, Vol. 81, No. 2 (Dec. 1985-Jan. 1986), pp. 97–111.
 W. Smith, Dictionary of Greek and Roman Biography and Mythology, v. 2, pp. 187-188.
 G. Traina, Marco Antonio, Roma-Bari 2003.
 C. Virlouvet, Fulvia, la pasionaria, in A. Fraschetti (ed.), Roma al femminile, Roma-Bari 1994.
 Kathryn E. Welch, Antony, Fulvia and the Ghost of Clodius in 47 B.C., Greece and Rome, Second Series, Vol. 42, No.2 (Oct., 1995), pp. 182–201.
 Allison J. Weir, 2007, A Study of Fulvia, Masters Thesis, Queen's University, Kingston, ON, see , accessed 18 April 2015.

Further reading
 G. Dareggi, “Sulle tracce di Fulvia, moglie del triumviro M. Antonio”, in G. Bonamente,  Augusta Perusia: studi storici e archeologici sull’epoca del bellum Perusinum, Perugia, 2012, 107-115. 
 M.-C. Ferriès, F. Delrieux, “Un tournant pour le monnayage provincial romain d’Asie Mineure: les effigies de matrones romaines, Fulvia, Octavia, Livia et Julia (43 a.C.-37 p.C.)”, in L. Cavalier, M.-C. Ferriès and F. Delrieux,  Auguste et l’Asie Mineure, Bordeaux, 2017, 357-383.  
F. Rohr Vio, “Dux femina: Fulvia in armi nella polemica politica di età triumvirale”, in T. Lucchelli and F. Rohr Vio, Viri militares: rappresentazione e propaganda tra Repubblica e Principato, Trieste, 2015, 61-89. 
Susanna Roxman, 2007, "Fulvia at Sicyon" (poem), in Imagining Seals, Edinburgh:Dionysia Press.
 C. Schubert, “Homo politicus - femina privata? Fulvia: eine Fallstudie zur späten römischen Republik”, in B. Feichtinger and G. Wöhrle,  Gender Studies in den Altertumswissenschaften: Möglichkeiten und Grenzen, Trier, 2002, 65-79 
Celia E. Schultz,  Fulvia: playing for power at the end of the Roman republic. New York, NY: Oxford University Press, 2021. ISBN 9780197601839

External links

 Bust of Fulvia
 Sculpture of Fulvia
 Statue of Fulvia

80s BC births
40 BC deaths
Ancient Roman women in warfare
1st-century BC Roman women
1st-century BC Romans
Achaia (Roman province)
Ancient Roman exiles
Fulvii
Wives of Mark Antony